Erina Hayashi and Moyuka Uchijima were the defending champions but Uchijima chose not to participate. Hayashi partnered alongside Kanako Morisaki, but lost to Momoko Kobori and Luksika Kumkhum in the semifinals.

Liang En-shuo and Wu Fang-hsien won the title, defeating Kobori and Kumkhum in the final, 2–6, 7–6(7–5), [10–2].

Seeds

Draw

Draw

References

External links
Main Draw

Shimadzu All Japan Indoor Tennis Championships - Doubles